KBTP may refer to:

 Butler County Airport (ICAO code KBTP)
 KBTP (FM), a radio station (101.1 FM) licensed to serve Mertzon, Texas, United States